Airea D. Matthews is an American poet. She is an Associate Professor of Creative Writing and the co-director of the Creative Writing Program at Bryn Mawr College. She was named the 2022-2023 Poet Laureate of Philadelphia.

Education and early life
Matthews received her B.A. in economics from the University of Pennsylvania. She holds an M.F.A. in poetry from the Helen Zell Writers’ Program and an M.P.A. in Social Policy from Gerald R. Ford School of Public Policy, both at the University of Michigan, Ann Arbor.

Career and writing 
Apart from her professorship at Bryn Mawr, Matthews is a visiting professor and scholar at the Institute for the Study of Global Racial Justice at Rutgers University. There she helped to develop the Poets and Scholars Summer Writing Retreat and the “Race, In Theory” Fellows Humanities Seminar.

Her work has appeared in Best American Poetry 2015, American Poet, Four Way Review, The Missouri Review, Muzzle, The Baffler, Callaloo, Indiana Review, WSQ, SLAB, Michigan Quarterly Review, and Vida: Her Kind.

Works
Simulacra, Yale University Press, March 2017. ,

Awards and honors 
In January 2022, Matthews was chosen as the sixth Poet Laureate of Philadelphia for the 2022–2023 term.

Matthews was awarded a fellowship from the Pew Center for Arts and Heritage in 2020.

In 2016, she won the Yale Younger Poet award, the Rona Jaffe Foundation Writers' Award, and the Louis Untermeyer Scholarship in Poetry from the 2016 Bread Loaf Writers’ Conference.

References

External links

"Airea, once."
Episode 43: Airea D. Matthews, Commonplace, 
"Airea D. Matthews, 2015 Literary Arts Fellow", Kresge Arts in Detroit
"Airea Dee's Open Road", Roadtrip Nation
"Airea D Matthews" at Kore Press

Living people
American women poets
Year of birth missing (living people)
Gerald R. Ford School of Public Policy alumni
Place of birth missing (living people)
21st-century American poets
21st-century American women writers
Yale Younger Poets winners
University of Michigan alumni
University of Pennsylvania School of Arts and Sciences alumni
Poets Laureate of Philadelphia
Municipal Poets Laureate in the United States
Writers from Philadelphia
Pew Fellows in the Arts
African-American Catholics